Tokyo City Nights is a life simulation video game developed by Gameloft Japan and published by Gameloft. It was released on November 4, 2008 in Japan for Wii (WiiWare) and for keypad-based mobile phones on November 14, 2008. It was Gameloft's first Japanese title.

The game involves players looking for a job and social and romantic success in Tokyo, Japan. It is part of Gameloft's Nights series, and unlike the rest of the series features a manga art style.

Gameplay

Plot

Reception

References

External links
 Japanese WiiWare page
 Official product page on Gameloft's website

2008 video games
Gameloft games
WiiWare games
Wii games
Japan-exclusive video games
Java platform games
Video games developed in Japan
Video games set in Tokyo
Simulation video games